Moneymakers (later Money Magazine) is a Canadian business television series which aired on CBC Television from 1975 to 1979.

Premise
The CBC replaced Dollars and Sense (1972–1975) and Payday (1973–1974) with this new series of discussions, filmed segments and interviews. Episodes were produced on the day prior to airing to allow for current news developments.

Scheduling
This half-hour series was broadcast as follows (times in Eastern zone):

References

External links
 

CBC Television original programming
1975 Canadian television series debuts
1979 Canadian television series endings